Protocadherin-7 is a protein that in humans is encoded by the PCDH7 gene.

This gene belongs to the protocadherin gene family, a subfamily of the cadherin superfamily. The gene encodes a protein with an extracellular domain containing 7 cadherin repeats. The gene product is an integral membrane protein that is thought to function in cell–cell recognition and adhesion. Alternative splicing yields isoforms with unique cytoplasmic tails.

References

Further reading